Phyllis Kirk (born Phyllis Kirkgaard; September 18, 1927  October 19, 2006) was an American actress.

Early life
Kirk was born in Syracuse, New York, although some sources state her birthplace as Plainfield, New Jersey. She contracted polio as a child, which resulted in health problems for the rest of her life. Kirk grew up in Elizabeth, New Jersey and graduated from Battin High School.

Career
As a teenager, Kirk moved to New York City to study acting and changed her last name from Kirkegaard to Kirk. She began her career on Broadway before embarking on a television and film career. Among 1949 stage appearances were My Name is Aquilon in New York and the road company of Present Laughter before beginning her long-term contract with Samuel Goldwyn in Hollywood that summer.

Kirk is best known for her many roles throughout the 1950s. She appeared with Vincent Price in the 3-D horror film House of Wax (1953). Her most notable television role was opposite Peter Lawford in The Thin Man (19571959), wherein they played Nick and Nora Charles. A newspaper columnist described what distinguished Kirk's role in the program: "[I]t's her brains that keep her flying high on 'The Thin Man' series."

She also appeared with Jerry Lewis in his 1957 film The Sad Sack and the 1956 film Back from Eternity. Kirk was a regular on The Red Buttons Show and appeared as a guest on some television programs, including an episode of The Twilight Zone ("A World of His Own"). As her acting career slowed down, Kirk began serving as an activist for various social causes. She vocally opposed death row inmate Caryl Chessman's death sentence and visited Chessman in prison until his execution in 1960. After the Watts Riots in 1965, she funded preschool programs for underprivileged families in South Los Angeles.

She granted interviews and wrote for the American Civil Liberties Union newspaper. Kirk made her last onscreen appearance in a 1970 episode of The F.B.I. before leaving show business altogether to enter public relations. She worked as a publicist for CBS News, and retired in 1992.

Personal life
Kirk's marriage to television producer and screenwriter Warren Bush was announced in the press in early 1967, and lasted until his death in 1992. A Democrat, she attended the 1960 Democratic National Convention in Los Angeles, California.

On October 19, 2006, Kirk died of a cerebral aneurysm at age 79 in Woodland Hills, California. She was buried with her husband Warren Bush at Arlington National Cemetery in Virginia.

Filmography

Film

Television

Award nominations

References

External links

Obituary on the Los Angeles Daily News
Freedom From Fear at This I believe
Heroine in the "House" on The Astounding B Monster
Phyllis Kirk at [http://www.glamourgirlsofthesilverscreen.com/ Glamour Girls of the Silver Screen
 

1927 births
2006 deaths
American film actresses
American stage actresses
American television actresses
20th-century American actresses
Actresses from Syracuse, New York
Burials at Arlington National Cemetery
People from Elizabeth, New Jersey
People with polio
Deaths from intracranial aneurysm
New York (state) Democrats
California Democrats
21st-century American women